Sadeqabad (also Romanized as Şādeqābād) is a village in Pirsalman Rural District, in the Central District of Asadabad County, Hamadan Province, Iran. At the 2006 census, its population was 255, in 61 families.

References 

Populated places in Asadabad County